Great race or The Great Race may refer to:

Great race, any one of the major human races
The race between the Central Pacific and Union Pacific Railroads to complete the First transcontinental railroad in the United States

Competition
 Great Race (classic rally), a vintage car club rally across the continental United States
 1908 New York to Paris Race, an international automobile race that was the inspiration for the 1965 film 
 The Great Race (Pimlico), 1877 two and a half-mile horse "match" race run by a trio of champions at the Pimlico Race Course
The Great Race (rowing), a New Zealand rowing race
Richard S. Caliguiri City of Pittsburgh Great Race, a 10k urban foot race
Eppie's Great Race, a triathlon held in Sacramento, California
The Great Race (relay), a three- or four-person relay race held each August in Auburn, New York
Bathurst 1000, a motor race held in Bathurst, New South Wales, often nicknamed "The Great Race"

Media, myth, fiction
The Great Race, 1965 comedy film by Blake Edwards
Thomas & Friends: The Great Race, a Thomas & Friends film
The great race between the animals, an ancient folk story underpinning the Chinese Zodiac
Great Race of Yith, a fictional Cthulhu Mythos species described by H.P. Lovecraft
Great Race (Native American legend), a Native American legend explaining man's dominion over the buffalo.